Angus Lake is a  lake located on Vancouver Island south of the Kennedy River below Kennedy Lake, east of the village of Ucluelet.

References

Clayoquot Sound region
Lakes of Vancouver Island
Clayoquot Land District